Phil(l)ip(p) Roth may refer to:

 Phil Roth (1930–2002), American television and film actor
 Philip Roth (1933–2018), American novelist
 Philipp Roth (1853–1898), German cellist
 Phillip J. Roth (born 1959), American producer, director and screenwriter